The Central District of Narmashir County is a district (bakhsh) in Narmashir County, Kerman Province, Iran. At the 2006 census, its population was 37,078, in 8,665 families.  The district has one city: Narmashir. The district has two rural districts (dehestan): Azizabad Rural District and Posht Rud Rural District.

References 

Narmashir County
Districts of Kerman Province